The 2010 Central Hockey League All-Star Game was held at the Laredo Entertainment Center in Laredo, Texas. The game was between the teams named The South Texas All-Stars and The CHL All-Stars.

Rosters

South Texas All-Stars

Starters

Forwards: Darryl Smith • Justin Quenneville • Jesse Bennefield 
Defencemen: Nathan Ansell • Adam Rivet 
Goaltender: J.P. Levasseur 

Reserves

Forwards: Evan Schwabe • Jeff Bes • Jereme Tendler • Sean Muncy • Grant Goeckner-Zoeller • Ryan Garbutt 
Defencemen: Jarred Mohr • Tom Sawatske • Jason Tessier • Kyle Peto 
Goaltenders: Andy Franck • Kevin Nastiuk

CHL All-Stars

Starters

Forwards: Riley Nelson • Rob Hisey • Justin Bowers 
Defencemen: Aaron Schneekloth • Alex Dunn 
Goaltender: Joel Martin
 
Reserves

Forwards: Les Reaney • Jordan Cameron • Kevin Ulanski • Dominic Leveille • Bruce Graham • Jeff Christian 
Defencemen: Andrew Smale • Derek Landmesser • Jon Landry • Jim Jorgensen 
Goaltenders: Danny Battochio • Ken Carroll

External links 
 Official Press Release
 Box Score
 South Texas Outshines CHL All-Stars

All-Star Game
Central Hockey League All-Star Games